Saint Mary's Catholic Church is between Third and Spring Streets in Kingman, Arizona. The church was built in 1906–07 with the Mission/Spanish Revival style. The native stone came from Metcalfe Quarry. The Catholic Church had two fundraising events to help raise money for St. Mary's and they were done in 1903 and 06. The church served Kingman from 1906 to 63. This church is on the National Register of Historic Places and the number is 86001166.

It was evaluated for National Register listing as part of a 1985 study of 63 historic resources in Kingman that led to this and many others being listed.

References

Churches on the National Register of Historic Places in Arizona
Churches in Mohave County, Arizona
Buildings and structures in Kingman, Arizona
Roman Catholic churches in Arizona
Catholic Church in Arizona
National Register of Historic Places in Kingman, Arizona